Buff Island is an Antarctic island which lies  southwest of the Joubin Islands and  southwest of Cape Monaco, Anvers Island, at the southwest end of the Palmer Archipelago. The island appears to be first shown and named on a 1936 chart by the British Graham Land Expedition under John Rymill.

See also 
 List of Antarctic and sub-Antarctic islands

References 

Islands of the Palmer Archipelago